USS Jackson (LCS-6) is an  of the United States Navy, and the first ship to be named for Jackson, the capital of Mississippi.

Design
In 2002, the U.S. Navy initiated a program to develop the first of a fleet of littoral combat ships.  The Navy initially ordered two trimaran hulled ships from General Dynamics, which became known as the Independence-class littoral combat ships after the first ship of the class, USS Independence.  Even-numbered U.S. Navy littoral combat ships are built using the Independence-class trimaran design, while odd-numbered ships are based on a competing design, the conventional monohull .  The initial order of littoral combat ships involved a total of four ships, including two of the Independence-class design. On 29 December 2010, the Navy announced that it was awarding Austal USA a contract to build ten additional Independence-class littoral combat ships.

Jackson is the third Independence-class littoral combat ship to be built. Jackson was built by Austal USA in Mobile, Alabama.

History 

Construction of Jackson began on 1 August 2011 with the first cutting of aluminum at Austal USA's Modular Manufacturing facility in Mobile, Alabama. The name of the ship was announced on 5 October 2011. The ship was launched on 14 December 2013. Jackson was delivered to the Navy on 11 August 2015 and placed into service that day. The ship was commissioned in a 5 December 2015 ceremony at Gulfport, Mississippi. She has been assigned to Littoral Combat Ship Squadron One

Jackson underwent the first of three shock trials in waters off Florida on 16 June 2016, and the last being reported having been completed the week prior to 20 July 2016.

On 23 May 2022, Jackson participated in the 28th Annual CARAT exercise with the Royal Thai Navy as a part of the Combined Task Force (CTF) 72. Jackson is attached to DESRON 7 and the US 7th Fleet. The MQ-8C Fire Scout unmanned helicopter was recently deployed on the ship.

References

External links

 

Independence-class littoral combat ships
2013 ships